, referred to as , is a Japanese railway holding company which primarily owns the Kintetsu Railway as well as Kintetsu World Express, Kintetsu Department Store, and its other 141 corporations, which are collectively known as Kintetsu Group.

Its subsidiaries operates tourism, real estate, and shipping companies, and has a major rail car-building operation Kinki Sharyo which produces trains used in Japan, the United States, Egypt and Hong Kong.

History
, a passenger rail transit company in Kinki and Tokai regions, was founded after Kansai Express Railways merged with Nankai Railways on June 1, 1944. Kinki Nippon Railways changed its legal name in English to Kintetsu Corporation on June 28, 2003. On April 1, 2015, the corporation, was restructured into a holding company, splitting its railway, real estate, logistics and retail, and recreation service divisions. Kintetsu Corporation also changed the legal name to Kintetsu Group Holdings Co., Ltd. on the same day.

Portfolio—subsidiaries

Passenger Transportation

Kintetsu Beppu Ropeway
Keihanna Bus Holdings Co., Ltd.
Kintetsu Bus Co., Ltd.
Narakanko Co., Ltd.
Nara Kotsu Bus Line Co., Ltd.
Kinki Sharyo

Transportation and Logistics
Kintetsu World Express (Air Freight)

Retail
Kintetsu Department Store

Recreation Facilities and Services
Kintetsu Hanazono Rugby Stadium
Kintetsu Liners (rugby team)
Miyako Hotels & Resorts
 Shima Spain Village theme park
Kinki Nippon Rent-A-Car
Kinki Nippon Tourist Travel Agency
Osaka Kintetsu Buffaloes (baseball team, present: Orix Buffaloes)

References

External links

 
 Travel agency web site
 Canada Travel agency web site

Companies based in Osaka Prefecture
Holding companies of Japan
Companies listed on the Tokyo Stock Exchange
Companies listed on the Nagoya Stock Exchange
Japanese companies established in 2015
Transport companies established in 2015
Holding companies established in 2015